Marisha Anne Chamberlain (born January 6, 1952) is an American writer. Her most recent work, the libretto for Mortals & Angels, a collaboration with American composer Carol Barnett, premiered at Carnegie Hall in 2016, a companion piece to their widely produced collaborative piece, The World Beloved: A Bluegrass Mass. Her stage plays, both original works and adaptations are widely produced. Her debut novel, The Rose Variations, was published by Soho Press in 2009. Her play, Scheherazade, won the Dramatists Guild/CBS National Award, and in her screenplay version, played on public television across the country, and was screened at the British Film Institute Festival in the category of Best of American Public Television.

Bibliography

Libretti

Mortals & Angels: A Bluegrass Te Deum with composer Carol Barnett, forthcoming from Boosey & Hawkes, 2016.
The World Beloved: A Bluegrass Mass, published by Boosey & Hawkes, 2008.
The World Beloved: A Bluegrass Mass CD, released on the Clarion Label, 2008

Plays

Hope for Breakfast (original full-length play), Playscripts Inc.
The Canterville Ghost (stage adaptation), Playscripts Inc., 2004
Rebecca of Sunnybrook Farm (stage adaptation), Playscripts Inc., 2004
Young Jane Eyre (stage adaptation), Playscripts Inc., 2004
Evergreen (original full-length play), Playscripts Inc., 2004
Little Women (stage adaptation), Playscripts Inc., 2003
Scheherazade (original full-length play), Dramatists Play Service, 1985
Scheherazade (play, German translation) Litag Theaterverlag, Bremen, Germany, 1991

Fiction and poetry

The Rose Variations (novel), Soho Press, 2009, 
Powers (poetry, Minnesota voices project), 1981,

References

1952 births
21st-century American novelists
20th-century American dramatists and playwrights
American poets
Living people